Aleksandr Nikolayevich Vasilyev (born 23 January 1992) is a Russian former professional football player.

Club career
He made his professional debut for PFC CSKA Moscow on 2 December 2010 in a 2010–11 UEFA Europa League game against FC Lausanne-Sport.

References

External links
 
 

1992 births
Living people
People from Ufimsky District
Russian footballers
Russia youth international footballers
Russia under-21 international footballers
Association football midfielders
PFC CSKA Moscow players
FC Sibir Novosibirsk players
FC Ufa players
FC Tyumen players
FC Armavir players
FC Stumbras players
Russian Premier League players
A Lyga players
Russian expatriate footballers
Expatriate footballers in Lithuania
FC Rostov players
FC Yenisey Krasnoyarsk players
FC Neftekhimik Nizhnekamsk players
Sportspeople from Bashkortostan